Jehu Amaziah Orr (May 10, 1828 – March 10, 1921) was a Confederate politician who served in the Confederate States Congress during the American Civil War.

He earned his Bachelor of Arts from Princeton University in 1849 and later returned to receive a Master of Arts in 1857.

Orr was born in Anderson County, South Carolina. He was the younger brother of James L. Orr. He later moved to Mississippi, where he was a member of the state legislature in 1852. He later represented the state in the Provisional Confederate Congress and the Second Confederate Congress. After the war he served as a state court judge from 1870 to 1876.

He died at the home of his daughter, suffragist and educator Pauline Van de Graaf Orr, in New York on March 10, 1921.

References

External links
 The Political Graveyard

1828 births
1921 deaths
People from Anderson County, South Carolina
American Presbyterians
Members of the Confederate House of Representatives from Mississippi
19th-century American politicians
Deputies and delegates to the Provisional Congress of the Confederate States
Members of the Mississippi House of Representatives
South Carolina Democrats
South Carolina lawyers
19th-century American lawyers